Richard Jenkin David (January 1879 – 24 October 1939) was a Welsh international rugby union scrum-half who played club rugby for Cardiff, and county rugby for Glamorgan. He was capped for the Wales national team on only one occasion, but faced two national touring teams with Cardiff. Later in his career he 'Went North' joining professional rugby league team Wigan.

Rugby career
David played school rugby for Albany Road School, and later progressed to Cathays United, a low level club based in Cardiff. David joined Cardiff RFC during the 1903/04 season, playing at scrum-half he formed a long half back relationship with Percy Bush. In 1905, David was selected for the Cardiff team to face the Original All Blacks, the very first touring New Zealand team.  David began the move that created the second Cardiff try during the game, but fullback Bert Winfield missed the conversion in the final minutes, giving the All Blacks a narrow victory.

In 1906, David faced his second touring side with Cardiff; Paul Roos' South Africans. Cardiff beat the tourists 17-0, the largest defeat for the South Africans that tour. The same season, David won his first and only Welsh cap, when he was chosen to face Ireland as part of the 1907 Home Nations Championship. The game began in controversy after the Welsh captain, Billy Trew, withdrew in protest to the treatment of suspended teammate Fred Scrine, by the Welsh Rugby Union. This left a space open at centre, which was taken by Bush, and to ensure club continuity David was brought in as his partner. The game ended in a record win over the Irish for Wales, but despite this the next season David was replaced by Newport's Tommy Vile.

In December 1907 David switched to professional rugby league, joining Wigan. He remained with Wigan for just the single season, and played his last game for them on 22 February 1908.

International matches played
Wales
  1907

Bibliography

References

1879 births
1939 deaths
Bath Rugby players
Cardiff RFC players
Glamorgan County RFC players
Rugby league players from Cardiff
Rugby union players from Cardiff
Rugby league halfbacks
Rugby union scrum-halves
Wales international rugby union players
Welsh rugby league players
Welsh rugby union players
Wigan Warriors players